Moth and Rust is a 1921 British silent drama film directed by Sidney Morgan and starring Sybil Thorndike, Malvina Longfellow and Langhorn Burton.

Cast
 Sybil Thorndike as Mrs Brand  
 Malvina Longfellow as Janet Black  
 Langhorn Burton as Ray Meredith  
 Cyril Raymond as Fred Black  
 George Bellamy as MacAlpine Brand  
 Malcolm Tod as Sir George Trefusis  
 Ellen Nicholls as Lady Trefusis 
 Phyllis le Grand as Lady Anne Varney

References

Bibliography
 Low, Rachael. The History of the British Film 1918-1929. George Allen & Unwin, 1971.

External links
 

1921 films
British drama films
British silent feature films
Films directed by Sidney Morgan
1921 drama films
British black-and-white films
1920s English-language films
1920s British films
Silent drama films